Pape Sané (born 30 December 1990) is a Senegalese professional footballer who plays as a striker. His first cap for the Senegal national football team was in 2013.

Club career
Sané began his senior career with Dakar-based club ASC Diaraf and was part of the side that won the Senegalese Cup in 2009. The following year, he helped the side to their tenth Senegal Premier League title, their first in six seasons. Sané remained with Diaraf until the end of the 2011 campaign before transferring to Ziguinchor-based outfit Casa Sport. In 2012, he was the highest goalscorer in the Senegal Premier League, as the team won the national championship for the first time in their history.

In September 2012, Sané agreed a deal to join French Championnat National club Boulogne, but the transfer ultimately fell through. His move to France eventually materialised on 31 January 2013, when he signed for Ligue 2 side Chamois Niortais on the final day of the winter transfer window along with Benin international Djiman Koukou. He made seven league appearances for Niort, two of them starts, during the remainder of the 2012–13 campaign. On 8 August 2013, it was announced that Sané had agreed a season-long loan deal with Championnat National outfit Colmar. He went on to score five goals in 30 league matches for the Alsatian club as they ended the campaign fourth in the standings, narrowly missing out on promotion to Ligue 2.

On 9 August 2014, he was again sent out on a season-long loan deal to a Championnat National side, this time joining FC Bourg-Péronnas. He scored on his debut for the club the following week in the 1–2 home defeat to his former club Colmar. At the end of his loan spell at Bourg-Péronnas, during which he scored 21 goals and helped the club gain promotion to Ligue 2, it was announced that Sané would join the club on a permanent basis.

On 1 February 2016, Bourg-Péronnas announced Ligue 1 team Stade Malherbe Caen had signed Sané. However, he would finish the current 2015–16 Ligue 2 season on loan.

International career
After finishing the 2012 season as the top goalscorer in the Senegalese league, Sané was called up to the Senegal national team for the friendly against Chile on 15 January 2013. He made his international début in the match and scored the opening goal of the game in the tenth minute, before being substituted for fellow debutant Alphonse Ba midway through the second half. Chile went on to win the match 2–1.

Honours
ASC Diaraf
 Senegal Premier League: 2010
 Senegal FA Cup: 2009

Casa Sport
 Senegal Premier League: 2012

References

External links
 

1990 births
Living people
Senegalese footballers
Association football forwards
ASC Jaraaf players
Casa Sports players
Chamois Niortais F.C. players
SR Colmar players
Football Bourg-en-Bresse Péronnas 01 players
Stade Malherbe Caen players
AJ Auxerre players
AS Nancy Lorraine players
Rodez AF players
Ligue 1 players
Ligue 2 players
Championnat National players
Championnat National 3 players
Senegal international footballers